The 1926 Villanova Wildcats football team represented the Villanova University during the 1926 college football season. The Wildcats team captain was Richard Moynihan.

Schedule

References

Villanova
Villanova Wildcats football seasons
Villanova Wildcats football